The London Borough of Barnet, on the northern outskirts of London, is mainly residential, but it has large areas of green space and farmland. Without this control, Barnet would be very different today, and this list of nature reserves would be much shorter.

Most of Barnet lies over London Clay, which is poor for agriculture, and open land is mainly used for activities such as horse grazing, playing fields, parks and golf courses. Features of the traditional agricultural landscape have survived, such as old hedgerows, ancient trees and areas of herb-rich grassland. Some hay meadows have a large diversity of wild flowers, and the London Ecology Unit (LEU) described them as one of Barnet's most important ecological assets.

Barnet has large areas with designations intended to protect them from "inappropriate development", and to "provide the strongest protection for the preservation of Barnet's green and natural open spaces".

In 1992 Barnet Council commissioned the LEU to carry out a survey of wildlife habitats in the borough, which looked at green sites covering , 45% of the borough. In 1997 the LEU published Nature Conservation in Barnet, which described 67 Sites of Importance for Nature Conservation (SINCs). This formed the basis of Barnet's nature conservation policies in its 2006 Unitary Development Plan, designated as "a material planning consideration" to be used as "non-statutory guidance". The table below lists SINCs described in Nature Conservation in Barnet. SINCs do not have statutory protection, but some sites are also wholly or partly designated as Sites of Special Scientific Interest or local nature reserves, which do have statutory protection. According to a report of the Department for Environment, Food and Rural Affairs, 39% of Barnet's SINCs were "in positive conservation management" in 2009–10. Barnet Council did not supply figures for 2010–11, 2011–12 or 2012–13.

Nature reserves

Key

Access
 P   = free public access to all or most of the site
 PP = free public access to part of the site
 PL = public at limited times
 F   = access on public footpaths only
 V   = can be viewed from adjacent paths or roads only
 NO = no public access

Type
 M     = Site of Metropolitan Importance – the best examples of London's habitats, or which contain rare species
 B1    = Site of Borough Importance Grade 1 – of significant value to the borough
 B2    = Site of Borough Importance, Grade 2 – as B1, but not as important
 L     = Site of local importance – of particular value to nearby residents or schools
 LNR   = Local nature reserve – of special interest locally for wildlife or geological features
 SSSI = Site of Special Scientific Interest – the country's best wildlife and geological sites
 CL  = registered common land – free public access to all of site

Sites

See also

Barnet parks and open spaces
List of Sites of Special Scientific Interest in Greater London
List of local nature reserves in Greater London

Notes

References

Sources

External links

Conservation in London
 
Geography of the London Borough of Barnet
 
London nature-related lists